Towers of Darkover is an anthology of fantasy and science fiction short stories edited by American writer Marion Zimmer Bradley. The stories are set in Bradley's world of Darkover. The book was first published by DAW Books (No. 919) in July 1993.

Contents
 Editorial by Marion Zimmer Bradley
 "Love of the Banshee" by Lynne Armstrong-Jones
 "The Wind Man" by Dorothy J. Heydt
 "Shelter" by Nina Boal
 "Carmen's Flight" by Margaret L. & Leslie R. Carter
 "Ten Minutes or So" by Marion Zimmer Bradley
 "Victory's Cost" by Patricia B. Cirone
 "Kefan McIlroy Is Snared" by Aletha Biedermann-Wiens
 "Rosa the Washerwoman" by Mary Ellen Fletcher
 "Like a Moth to the Flame" by Emily Alward
 "A Change of View" by Judith Kobylecky
 "Choices" by Lynn Michals
 "A Lesser Life" by Patricia Duffy Novak
 "Summer Storms" by Glenn Sixbury
 "Conscience" by Alexandra Sarris
 "Shame" by Charley Pearson
 "The Frontier" by Diana L. Paxson
 "The Aillard Anomaly" by Diann Partridge
 "Destined for the Tower" by Elisabeth Waters and Deborah Wheeler
 "The Madwoman of the Kilghard Hills" by Joan Marie Verba
 "I'm a Big Cat Now" by David R. Heydt

References
 
 
 

Darkover books
1993 anthologies
American anthologies
Fantasy anthologies
Works by Marion Zimmer Bradley
DAW Books books